This is a sub-article to Białystok
In the 19th century Białystok was an important center for light industry and was the reason for the substantial growth of the city's population. The tradition continued with many garment factories established in the 20th century, such as Fasty in the district of Bacieczki. However, after the fall of communism in 1989 many of these factories faced severe problems and subsequently closed down.

Employment
The unemployment rate for February 2011 in Białystok was 13.2%.

Household budgets
The 2009 average household had a monthly per capita income of 1018.77 zł  and monthly per capita expenses of 823.56 zł

Industry
The leading industries in the city's economy are: food processing (production of meat products, fruit and vegetable products, the production of spirits, the production of frozen food, grain processing), electrical engineering (production tools and equipment for machine tools, production of electric heaters, manufacture and production mixers household appliances). There is also a developed machine industry (electronics, machinery and metal), plastic processing (production of household appliances), textiles (textiles and upholstery, manufacture of underwear, clothing accessories, footwear and backpacks), Wood (production plywood and furniture) building materials.

Some notable major employers who are based in Białystok include:
 Dojlidy Brewery in the district of Dojlidy produces the second most popular beer in Poland, Zubr.
 Polmos Białystok, the biggest vodka manufacturer in Poland, is located in the city district of Starosielce. The company produces Absolwent and Żubrówka (bison grass vodka) - both major exports abroad.
 Standard Motor Products Poland Ltd. headquartered in Białystok began manufacturing ignition coils for original equipment manufacturers 30 years ago.
 "Supon" Białystok is the leading Polish producer of fire fighting equipment.
 SavaPol, Sp.z o.o. is a manufacturer of stationary and mobile concrete mixing equipment based in Białystok.
 Biazet S.A. is a large manufacture of household appliances, including vacuum cleaners, coffee makers, and LED lighting located in Białystok.
 Agnella, a major Polish producer of carpets and similar products is in Białystok,  located in the district of Białostoczek.
 Rosti (Polska) Sp. z o.o., has provided for more than 60 years precision injection molded products for some of the world's leading brands.
 Biaglass Huta Szkla Białystok Sp. z o.o.,established in 1929, produces mouth blown glass lampshades and related products. Biaglass belongs to elite group of Glass Works in Europe, where 100% of the lighting glass is mouth-blown.

Border crossings
The area has a number of nearby border crossings.

Since the border with Belarus is also the eastern border of the European Union, as well as the Schengen Area the city is a center for trade in mainly from the east.

City budget
For the 2010-2011 Fiscal year the city received revenue (taxes levied + investments) of 1,409,565,525 zł, expended 1,676,459,102 zł leaving a budget deficit of 266,893,577 zł. The deficit was covered by short-term borrowing of 166,893,577 zł and the issuance of 100 million zł in municipal bonds.

Land use

Manufacturing

Białystok is a major center for the textile industry is also developed machine industry (electronics, machinery and metal), wood, alcoholic beverages, building materials, glass factory and power generation.

Dojlidy Brewery in the district of Dojlidy and is owned by the Kompampania Piwowarska group. The brewery produces the second most popular beer in Poland, Zubr, featuring the motif of the European bison (one of Podlaskie's tourist attractions) in its marketing campaign.

Polmos Białystok, the biggest vodka manufacturer in Poland, is located in the city district of Starosielce. The company produces Absolwent and Żubrówka (bison grass vodka) - both major exports abroad.

Over thirty years ago Standard Motor Products Poland Ltd. headquartered in Białystok, Poland began manufacturing ignition coils for original equipment manufacturers.

"SUPON" BIAŁYSTOK is a production and trade enterprise with over 40 years of tradition. They are the leading Polish producer of fire fighting equipment.

SavaPol, Sp.z o.o. is a manufacturer of stationary and mobile concrete mixing equipment based in Białystok.

Biazet S.A. is a large manufacture of household appliances, including vacuum cleaners, coffee makers, and LED lighting located in Białystok. 
 
Philips Domestic Appliances has a factory in the city

Białystok Power Station is a co-generation power plant in the city

Agnella, a major Polish producer of carpets and similar products is in Białystok,  located in the district of Białostoczek.

Bianor, a Dutch-owned maker of plastic parts and products for the household appliances and other industries, is expanding its manufacturing facility in Białystok.

Rosti (Polska) Sp. z o.o., has, for more than 60 years, provided precision injection molded products for some of the world's leading brands.

Biaglass Huta Szkla Białystok Sp. z o.o., was established in 1929 and has specialized in the production of mouth blown glass lampshades. Biaglass belongs to elite group of Glass Works in Europe, where 100% our lighting glass is mouth-blown.

International trade

Since the border with Belarus is also the eastern border of the European Union, as well as the Schengen Area, Białystok plays an important role in managing the border's security with the regional office of the Polish Border Guard, located in the city.

The city is a center for trade in mainly from the east. It works in the Eastern Market Promotion Centre. Białystok Market hosts international textiles and clothing, food processing, consumer goods, agricultural products, and food.

Retail

In Białystok there are: 7 hypermarkets, 27 supermarkets, 9 shopping malls (Galeria Biała, Alfa, two  Auchan, Kwadrat, Podlaska, Zielone Wzgórza, Galeria M, Galeria Antoniukowska), 19 electronic stores, supermarkets construction and decoration.

References